Events from the year 2007 in South Korea.

Incumbents
President: Roh Moo-hyun
Prime Minister: 
 Han Myeong-sook until April 2, 
 Han Duck-soo

Events 
 February 7: Manhunt International 2007
 April 2: Han Duck-soo becomes prime minister of South Korea, replacing Han Myeong-sook
 June 30: The Free trade agreement between the United States of America and the Republic of Korea is signed.
 July 19: 2007 South Korean hostage crisis in Afghanistan
 August 17: Jellyfish Entertainment is founded. 
 November 17: 2007 Mnet Asian Music Awards
 December 7: 2007 South Korea oil spill
 December 19: 2007 South Korean presidential election
 BBK stock price manipulation incident

Sport
 2007 in South Korean football
 2007 Korea Professional Baseball season
 South Korea at the 2007 Asian Indoor Games
 South Korea at the 2007 Asian Winter Games
 South Korea at the 2007 World Championships in Athletics
 South Korea at the 2007 UCI Road World Championships
 2007 Korea Open Super Series
 2007 Asian Canoe Sprint Championships
 2007 FIBA Asia Championship for Women

Film
 List of South Korean films of 2007
 List of 2007 box office number-one films in South Korea
 28th Blue Dragon Film Awards
 44th Grand Bell Awards

Television
 1st Korea Drama Awards
 2007 KBS Drama Awards
 2007 MBC Drama Awards
 The first SBS Entertainment Awards ceremony.

Births

 March 21 - Moon Mason, actor and model

Deaths

January 21 - U;Nee, singer, rapper, dancer and actress (b. 1981)
February 10 - Jeong Da-bin, actress (b. 1980)

See also
2007 in South Korean music

References

 
South Korea
South Korea
Years of the 21st century in South Korea
2000s in South Korea